This is the electoral history of George W. Bush, who served as the 43rd president of the United States (2001–2009) and as the 46th governor of Texas (1995–2000).

1978 congressional election

1994 Texas gubernatorial election

almost lost

1998 Texas gubernatorial election

2000 United States presidential election

Source:

Republican presidential primaries (2000)

Popular vote

Delegate count

2004 United States presidential election

Source (Electoral and Popular Vote): Federal Elections Commission Electoral and Popular Vote Summary

Footnotes

References

George W. Bush
Bush, George W.
Bush, George W.